JAM (short for Jan Dhan-Aadhaar-Mobile) trinity refers to the government of India initiative to link Jan Dhan accounts, mobile numbers and Aadhaar cards of Indians to plug the leakages of government subsidies.

History
The JAM trinity was proposed in the Economic Survey of 2014-15.

Jan Dhan Yojana

Pradhan Mantri Jan-Dhan Yojana is India's National Mission for Financial Inclusion to ensure access to financial services, namely banking savings and deposit accounts, remittance, credit, insurance and pension in an affordable manner. This financial inclusion campaign was launched by the Prime Minister of India Narendra Modi on 28 August 2014. He had announced this scheme on his first Independence Day speech on 15 August 2014.

Run by Department of Financial Services, Ministry of Finance, on the inauguration day, 1.5 crore (15 million) bank accounts were opened under this scheme. Guinness World Records recognises the achievements made under PMJDY, Guinness World Records Certificate says "The most bank accounts opened in 1 week as a part of financial inclusion campaign is 18,096,130 and was achieved by Banks in India from 23 to 29 August 2014". By 1 June 2016, over 22 crore (220 million) bank accounts were opened and ₹384.11 billion (US$5.7 billion) were deposited under the scheme.

Aadhaar

The Unique Identification Authority of India is a central government agency of India. Its objective is to collect the biometric and demographic data of residents, store them in a centralised database, and issue a 12-digit unique identity number called Aadhaar to each resident. It is considered the world's largest national identification number project.

, the original legislation to back UIDAI is still pending in the Parliament of India. However, on 3 March 2016, a new money bill was introduced in the Parliament for the purpose. On 11 March 2016, the Aadhaar (Targeted Delivery of Financial and other Subsidies, benefits and services) Act, 2016, was passed in the Lok Sabha. On 26 March, 2016, The Aadhaar (Targeted Delivery of financial & Other Subsidies, Benefits & Services) Act, 2016 was notified in the Gazette of India.

Some civil liberty groups, like Citizens Forum for Civil Liberties and Indian Social Action Forum (INSAF), have opposed the project on privacy concerns.

On 23 September 2013, the Supreme Court of India issued an interim order saying that "no person should suffer for not getting Aadhaar" as the government cannot deny a service to a resident if s/he does not possess Aadhaar, as it is voluntary and not mandatory. In another interim order on 11 August 2015, the Supreme  Court of India ruled that "UIDAI/Aadhaar will not be used for any other purposes except PDS, kerosene and LPG distribution system" and made it clear that even for availing these facilities Aadhaar card will not be mandatory. However, in 2018 the top court upheld the country’s biometric identity system and also cleared mandatory Aadhaar enrolment of recipients of government welfare benefits, stating "Aadhaar card is however must for availing facilities of welfare schemes and government subsidies as it empowers the poor and marginalised."

References

Modi administration initiatives
E-government in India
Government schemes in India